Knut Arne Börjesson (14 April 1925 – 2 July 2017) was a Swedish racewalker. He competed in the 10 km event at the 1952 Summer Olympics, but failed to reach the final.

References

1925 births
2017 deaths
Swedish male racewalkers
Olympic athletes of Sweden
Athletes (track and field) at the 1952 Summer Olympics
Athletes from Gothenburg
20th-century Swedish people
21st-century Swedish people